The Sepahsālār Mosque ( - Masjed-e Sepahsālār) is a famous historic mosque in Tehran, Iran. The construction project of the mosque was started in 1879 upon the order of Mirza Hosein Sepahsalar, the Grand Vizir of Iran during Naser al-Din Shah Qajar, and the first phase of construction was finished after five years since it was started. The mosque was renamed the Shahid Motahhari, after the 1979 Iranian Revolution, but it is commonly known as its initial name of Sepahsalar Mosque.

The Sepahsalar Mosque is one of the largest Mosque in Tehran. During the late Qajar as well as Pahlavi era, Sepahsalar mosque was distinctive landmark of Tehran with its eight minarets which was unique in  Persian design of mosques.

The mosque is located southeast of Baharestan square, next to the former National Consultative Majlis of Iran.

Architecture

The Sepahsalar Mosque is the first mosque in Tehran whose design is mix of Persian architecture and architecture of mosques in Istanbul. The building is inspired by Jameh Mosque of Isfahan, Chaharbagh School and Sultan Ahmed Mosque. The mosque has a special dome and eight minarets.

The main entrance portal and the facade are of a quite distinctive Qajar style. Two massive minarets flank the recessed entrance, which leads into a courtyard surrounded by twin-storeyed arcades of college rooms; in all there are some 60 chambers.

Tiles with full-blown floral motifs in typically flamboyant Qajar style decorate the courtyard, while a tile inscription band gives details of the original endowment. The prayer hall dome, 37m in height, is supported by 44 columns.

Events
Former Prime Minister and Minister of the Royal Court Abdolhossein Hazhir was assassinated by a member of the Fada'iyan-e Islam at the mosque in November 1949.

Gallery

See also
 Baharestan
 List of Mosques in Iran
 Shah Mosque (Tehran)
 Iranian architecture
 History of Persian domes

References

External links 

Mosques in Tehran
Mosque buildings with domes
Buildings of the Qajar period